Santiago Artigas or Santiago Artigas Andreu (May 21, 1881 – October 9, 1931) was a Spanish actor.

Spanish male stage actors
1881 births
1931 deaths